Sisia is an island in Tonga. It is located within the Vava'u Group in the far north of the country.

Geography
Sisia is a small island between Nuapapu, Kapa and ʻEuakafa. It lies in the canal together with Fonualai (W) and Katafanga. It is located 14 kilometres from the main island of ʻUta Vava'u.

History
According to Tongan mythology, legend affirms that Sisia was created by the god Maui who reached the bottom of the sea and pulled it up to the surface and it became part of the Vava‘u group.

The first recorded European to sight Sisia was believed to be Spanish navigator Don Francisco Antonio Mourelle aboard the Princesa on 4 March 1781.

Since then, Sisia has maintained its own deep-sea anchor and is a popular tropical haven for boating.

Tourism
Sisia is a tropical desert islet with no accommodation facilities. It is surrounded by its white sand beach with beautiful views of blue ocean and serves as an all-day anchorage. In mid-July, Sisia sees a possible activity of whale watching.

References

Islands of Tonga
Vavaʻu